Guglielmo Spinello (born 21 November 1941) is an Italian boxer. He competed in the men's light heavyweight event at the 1972 Summer Olympics.

References

1941 births
Living people
Italian male boxers
Olympic boxers of Italy
Boxers at the 1972 Summer Olympics
Sportspeople from Padua
Light-heavyweight boxers
20th-century Italian people